The Linden City School District  is the city school district for Linden in Marengo County, Alabama.  It is the smallest school district in the state.  It operates three schools, which include Linden Elementary School, George P. Austin Junior High School, and Linden High School.  The system educates roughly 500 students and employs more than 80.

Failing schools
Statewide testing ranks the schools in Alabama. Those in the bottom six percent are listed as "failing." As of early 2018, Linden High School was included in this category.

References

External links

Education in Marengo County, Alabama
School districts in Alabama